= Golden Globe Award for Best Supporting Actor =

Golden Globe Award for Best Supporting Actor may refer to:

- Golden Globe Award for Best Supporting Actor – Motion Picture
- Golden Globe Award for Best Supporting Actor – Series, Miniseries or Television Film
